This is a list of vice presidents of the Examination Yuan, deputy of a constitutional branch in Taiwan:

List

Timeline

See also 
 Constitution of the Republic of China
 List of presidents of the Examination Yuan

References

Examination Yuan